The Racist Mind: Portraits of American Neo-Nazis and Klansmen is a book by Raphael S. Ezekiel.  It attempts to provide sociological and psychological insights into White supremacist groups, including neo-Nazi groups and the Ku Klux Klan, and their members. 

The book is divided into three parts: "Gatherings" (relating the author's attendance at rallies, trials, and congresses), "National Leaders" (Tom Metzger, Dave Holland, and Richard Butler), and "Detroit" (portraits of the members of a neo-Nazi group).

It was published by Viking Press in 1995 (hardcover, 368 pages); it was reprinted in paperback by Penguin in 1996.

Contents
Acknowledgments
Note on Names and Pseudonyms
Introduction
Part One: Gatherings
One: Klan Rally at Stone Mountain, Georgia
Two: Breakfast in Arkansas - Sedition Trial
Three: Aryan Nations Congress - Northern Idaho
Part Two: National Leaders
Four: Introduction
Five: Tom Metzger: White Aryan Resistance
Six: Dave Holland: Southern White Knights
Seven: Richard Butler: Aryan Nations
Eight: Reflections
Part Three: Detroit
Nine: Introduction
Ten: Contact
Eleven: Paul
Twelve: Terri
Thirteen: William
Fourteen: Raymond and Rosandra
Fifteen: Francis
Sixteen: Joey, Eddie
Seventeen: Nolan
Eighteen: Reflections
Epilogue
Appendix: Suggested Reading

External links
"An Ethnographer Looks at Neo-Nazi and Klan Groups: The Racist Mind Revisited" by Raphael S. Ezekiel in American Behavioral Scientist, Vol. 46, No. 1, 51-71 (2002).
 on Tom Metzger, at Nizkor.

1995 non-fiction books
Viking Press books
Books about the Ku Klux Klan
Non-fiction books about racism
Neo-Nazism in the United States